Reginald Brooks-King (27 August 1861 – 19 September 1938) was a Welsh archer. He was born in Dixton, Monmouth, Wales, to James Pearce King and Katherine Bagnall. He won the silver medal in the men's double York round at the 1908 Summer Olympics. Brooks-King shot a 393 in the first round of the competition, held in London.  This put him in second place, 10 points behind leader William Dod halfway through the event.  On the second day of shooting, Brooks-King hit a 375 to take fourth place on the day but second place overall with 768 points, well behind Dod but 8 points ahead of Henry B. Richardson in third.

Biography 
Reginald Brooks-King was one of seven children born to James Pearce King and Katherine Bagnall in Dixton, Monmouth. Reginald was a student at King's College, London, studying engineering and applied sciences from 1880 to 1882. From 1886 to 1887 he was second draughtsman in the drawing office of W.G Bagnall. He married Jessie Bagnall in January 1893 and together they had two children, Morrice Brooks-King and Edith Marian Brooks-King. He played minor counties cricket for Wiltshire in the 1903 Minor Counties Championship, making two appearances. Reginald died in 1938 in Devon, United Kingdom.

References

External links
 Reginald Brooks-King on databaseOlympics.com 
 Reginald Brooks-King. The Malvern Register 1865–1905, p. 75.
 Reginald Brooks-King's profile at Sports Reference.com

1861 births
1938 deaths
Archers at the 1908 Summer Olympics
Olympic archers of Great Britain
Welsh male archers
Welsh Olympic medallists
Olympic silver medallists for Great Britain
Sportspeople from Monmouth, Wales
Olympic medalists in archery
Medalists at the 1908 Summer Olympics
Welsh cricketers
Wiltshire cricketers